Ngong Shuen Chau Naval Base is part of the People's Liberation Army Hong Kong Garrison and small naval base on Stonecutters Island (Ngong Shuen Chau), Hong Kong. It is home to the South Sea Fleet Squadron # 38081 and sub-base to the naval squadron of the South Sea Fleet. The area surrounding the base is off limits to civilian ship traffic.

History
The naval base was built by the contractors during the handover period in 1996–1997 and one of a few military installations that was not transferred from the British. The naval base is located on the South Shore of the former Stonecutter's Island and located south of the former  (now the  Government Dockyard). Most of the facility was created from dredging and in-fill project in the early 1990s in anticipation of the move of Tamar and the handover. The older buildings and recreation facilities were inherited from the Hong Kong Military Service Corps. Many buildings in the base date to the 1930s, but some are as far back as the 1870s.

A list of historic buildings at the naval facility:
 Navy, Army and Air Force Institutes
 Lido - recreation facilities including a pool
 Building # 31 - South Shore
 Building # 23 (old Fire Station) - South Shore
 Building # 25 - South Shore
 Ferry Waiting Room
 Shaffies Curry House - South Shore
 Old Military Prison
 Colchester Road
 Didcot Road
 Upside-Down House (#24 South Shore)
 Ammunition Depot and Bunkers
 Sub Ammo Depot
 Married Quarters
 LEP/HKMSC Medical Centre
 Barracks #25 - built 1905
 Old Centurion Battery 
 Western Battery
 Eastern Battery
 Watch Towers
 South Shore Gun Battery
 Armament Depot
 Officer's Mess
 Old Watch Tower 1870
 Wuthering Height's Quarters
 St Barbara's Garrison Church
 East Pier
 Transmitting Station
 Receiving Station
 Central Battery

Roads within the base once had British names, but they have since been dropped:
 Colchester Road
 Didcot Road

The most high profile visitor to the base was Hu Jintao in 2007.

Ships
Various ships of the People's Liberation Army Navy visit the base, but only a few ships remain on semi-permanent basis.

Facilities
Like the last HMS Tamar, Ngong Shuen Chau is a low-frills and low key naval facility.

Access to the base is made via Chi Ngong Road, but access into the naval yard is restricted and surrounding areas fenced off.
A heavily wooded area to the north protects the base from unwanted visitors.
 basin and concrete berthing facility
 naval barracks
 exercise track
 parade grounds
 numerous low-rise naval buildings
 Ngong Shuen Chau Naval Base Theatre

During the summer months the base is open to the public, but otherwise closed during most of the year.

References

External links
 PLA Hong Kong Garrison

Military of Hong Kong
Barracks in Hong Kong
People's Liberation Army Navy bases
Sham Shui Po District